These burial places of British royalty  record the known graves of monarchs who have reigned in some part of the British Isles (currently includes only the monarchs of Scotland, England, native princes of Wales to 1283, or monarchs of Great Britain, and the United Kingdom), as well as members of their royal families.

Monarchs of England (to 1603)

Pre-conquest

Post-conquest

Monarchs of Scotland (to 1603)

Native princes of Wales (to 1283)

Monarchs since 1603
(of England, and Scotland (1603–1707); of Great Britain (1707–1801); of United Kingdom (1801–present))

Interregnum. As Lords Protector the Cromwells served as heads of state and exercised monarchical power  

Restored monarchy

Jacobite pretenders

Other Royal burials (by place)

Sources

 Burial Places of the Kings & Queens of Britain britannia.com (Accessed 20 June 2007 – NB contains errors)

References and notes

British monarchy
Burials in the United Kingdom
History of the British Isles
Burial sites of British royal houses